Jimmy Chérizier (born 1976 or 1977), also known by the pseudonym "Babekyou" or "Barbecue", is a Haitian gang leader and former police officer who is the head of Fòs Revolisyonè G9 an fanmi e alye ("Revolutionary Forces of the G9 Family and Allies", abbreviated "G9" or "FRG9"), a federation of over a dozen Haitian gangs based in Port-au-Prince. Chérizier is currently considered one of, if not the, most powerful gang leaders in Haiti. He is believed to be responsible for numerous large-scale massacres in the Port-au-Prince area.

Early life and career as police officer 
Jimmy Chérizier was born in Delmas, Ouest, which is located in the Port-au-Prince Arrondissement and next to the slums of La Saline, Port-au-Prince. He was one of eight children, and his father died when he was five years old.

Chérizier was a police officer for the Haitian National Police before becoming a gang leader. Chérizier belonged to the Unité Départementale pour le Maintien de l'Ordre (UDMO, trans. "Unit for the Maintenance of Order"), a special unit within the Haitian National Police. Chérizier became a gang leader in Base Delmas 6, Delmas, Ouest, perpetrating multiple large-scale massacres. While he was a police officer, Chérizier is alleged to have perpetrated the 2018 La Saline massacre in which at least 71 people were killed and over 400 homes were burned down. He is also accused of having involvement in the 2017 Grande Ravine Massacre which killed at least 9 people, and the 2019 Bel-Air Massacre. In December 2018, Chérizier was fired by the Haitian National Police.

Leader of Fòs Revolisyonè G9 an fanmi e alye 
Chérizier is the leader of Revolutionary Forces of the G9 Family and Allies, a self-described federation of gangs. The group was originally composed of nine gangs, but has since grown to include over a dozen. The formation of the G9 was officially announced by Chérizier in a YouTube video on 10 June 2020, soon after the May 2020 Port-au-Prince massacre. The G9 has been described as one of about 95 gangs that battle for supremacy in Port-au-Prince. Its stronghold is believed to be the commune of Delmas, Ouest, and as of July 2021 it controlled Martissant, Village de Dieu, Grande Ravine, Bel Air, Cité Soleil, Fort Dimanche, and many other areas in Port-au-Prince. These areas give the G9 a hold over the center of Port-au-Prince as well as northern and southern access points to its metropolitan area, which allow the G9 to isolate Port-au-Prince from the rest of Haiti at their will.

On 12 May 2021, Chérizier was reportedly wounded during a gunfight with a rival gang. A Doctors Without Borders facility in Martissant, Port-au-Prince, denied rumors that he had received medical treatment at the facility.

Massacres 
The G9 has allegedly been responsible for numerous massacres of civilians in Haiti, including the 24–27 May 2020 massacre across various neighborhoods across Port-au-Prince that killed 6 to 34 people, the August–September 2020 massacre that left 22 dead, and the April 2021 massacre that resulted from an attempted takeover of Bel Air in Port-au-Prince. The National Human Rights Defense Network (RNDDH), a human rights group based in Haiti, reported the 2020–21 massacre in Bel Air committed by the G9 that shot and killed 81 people (36 people from August to December 2020 and 45 people from March to May 2021) and left 18 missing, and the massacre in Cité Soleil from January to May 2021 committed by the G9 that shot and killed 44 people and left 7 missing. Human rights groups and victims have described the G9's tactics to include random killing of civilians, systematic rape, looting and torching villages, kidnapping, and dismemberment.

Relationship with President Jovenel Moïse 
The G9 was at one time described as closely allied with former President Jovenel Moïse and free from prosecution as long as they enforced street-level peace. In investigating the 2020–21 Bel Air massacre and the 2021 Cité Soleil massacre, RNDDH reported that Haitian National Police officers did not intervene in the massacres after failing to receive orders from superiors and did not file any police reports on witness testimony, and that judicial authorities claimed to have received no complaints from any massacre victims. RNDDH also stated that they received reports that police equipment was used to conduct the massacres. It is alleged by some Haitians that President Jovenel Moïse was responsible for the massacres, using Chérizier's gang to repress government dissidents.

In the weeks leading up to the assassination of Jovenel Moïse, the United Nations described gang violence as peaking at "unprecedented levels," and gang violence had caused a mass exodus of several thousands of people from Port-au-Prince. On 23 June 2021, Chérizier made a statement in which he declared that the G9 gang collective would lead an armed revolution against Haiti's business and political elites, and described the G9 as filling the void left by government weakness and a force "to deliver Haiti from the opposition, the government, and the Haitian bourgeoisie." He gave this statement to local media outlets surrounded by gang members wielding machetes and guns, and the statement was posted on YouTube. Chérizier publicly demanded Moïse's resignation from office a week before the assassination, calling for a "national dialogue" to redefine the country. In the aftermath of the assassination, Chérizier publicly mourned Moïse, including leading a crowd of more than 1,000 demonstrators calling for justice against the perpetrators.

2022 gang war with G-Pèp 

Beginning in July 2022, the G9 engaged in a gang war with rival gang G-Pèp for the control of Cité Soleil, Port-au-Prince. The resulting 2022 Port-au-Prince gang war resulted in at least 50 people dead.

September–November 2022 Varreux fuel terminal blockade 

On 12 September 2022, during the fuel shortages part of the 2022 Haitian crisis, the G9 seized control of the Varreux fuel terminal, the main gas terminal in Port-au-Prince and one of Haiti's main fuel terminals. The G9 blockaded access to the terminal, cutting fuel supplies of about 10 millions gallons of diesel and gasoline and more than 800,000 gallons of kerosene to the rest of the nation. The blockade caused gas stations and schools to close, hospitals to reduce services due to running on limited power, and banks and grocery stores to run on a limited schedule.

Chérizier initially demanded the resignation of President and Prime Minister Ariel Henry as conditions for the end of the blockade. However after Ariel Henry requested foreign military aid to end the blockade, Chérizier changed his conditions to be amnesty for arrest warrants issued for crimes allegedly committed by himself and other G9 members. In an interview, Jean Rebel Dorcénat of the Haitian government's National Commission for Disarmament, Demobilization and Reintegration (CNDDR) said that the G9 also demanded government positions within Ariel Henry's cabinet. After negotiations with Henry, the G9 ended the blockade in November.

Sanctions 
On 10 December 2020, the United States Department of the Treasury imposed sanctions on Chérizier and two senior Haitian government officials who allegedly provided police equipment, guns, and vehicles for massacres against the Haitian people.

On 21 October 2022, the United Nations Security Council unanimously imposed its first sanctions on Haiti in five years (resolution 2653), establishing a one-year travel ban, asset freeze and arms embargo on Jimmy Chérizier and other persons or entities designated by a newly established Security Council sanctions committee.

Nickname 
Chérizier has denied that his nickname "Babekyou" (or "Barbecue") came from accusations of his setting people on fire.  Instead, he says it was from his mother's having been a fried chicken street vendor.

See also 
United Nations Security Council Resolution 2653

References 

21st-century criminals
1970s births
Haitian criminals
Haitian police officers
Haitian revolutionaries
Living people
People from Port-au-Prince